Emanuel Fernandes (born July 25, 1967) is a beach volleyball player from Angola.

He and team mate Morais Abreu represented Angola at the 2008 Summer Olympics in Beijing, China.

References

External links
 
 

1967 births
Living people
Beach volleyball players at the 2008 Summer Olympics
Angolan beach volleyball players
Olympic beach volleyball players of Angola
Men's beach volleyball players